The following lists events that happened during 1893 in South Africa.

Incumbents
 Governor of the Cape of Good Hope and High Commissioner for Southern Africa:Henry Brougham Loch.
 Governor of the Colony of Natal: 
 until July: Charles Bullen Hugh Mitchell.
  July–September : Francis Seymour Haden
 starting 27 September: Walter Hely-Hutchinson.
 State President of the Orange Free State: Francis William Reitz.
 State President of the South African Republic: Paul Kruger.
 Prime Minister of the Cape of Good Hope: Cecil John Rhodes.
 Prime Minister of the Colony of Natal:

Events
January
 10 – The South African and International Exhibition closes
May
 23 – Mahatma Gandhi arrives in Durban.

Unknown date
 The first Crocidolite (Blue Asbestos) mine is opened near Prieska.

Births
 16 May – Clement Martyn Doke, South African linguist. (d. 1980)

Deaths
 30 April – Johannes Willem Viljoen, big-game hunter and politician, dies on his farm near Zeerust at the age of 81.
 23 June – Sir Theophilus Shepstone, South African statesman. (b. 1817)
 9 July – George Christopher Cato, the first mayor of Durban, dies at the age of 79.

Railways

Railway lines opened
 1 January – Transvaal – Germiston to Pretoria, .

 30 December – Transvaal – Nelspruit to Airlie, .

Locomotives
Cape
 The Cape Government Railways places the first of forty 6th Class 4-6-0 passenger steam locomotives in service on its Western and Midland Systems. They will become the Class 6 on the South African Railways in 1912.

Transvaal
 The first of an eventual 175 46 Tonner  tank steam locomotives are placed in service by the Nederlandsche-Zuid-Afrikaansche Spoorweg-Maatschappij in the Zuid-Afrikaansche Republiek. The survivors will become the Class B on the South African Railways in 1912.

References

History of South Africa